Wehshi Daku (Punjabi) is a 1982 Pakistani, action and a drama film directed by Ali Tahir and produced by Nisar Ali Shah. Film starring actor Sultan Rahi, Musarrat Shaheen, Usman Peerzada, and Mehboob Alam, Edited by Mohammad Ashiq Ali.

Cast 

 Sultan Rahi
 Musarrat Shaheen
 Nazli
 Usman Peerzada
 Ali Ejaz
 Shehla Gul
 Nadria Mumtaz
 Shahida
 ChunChun

 Jani
 Sheikh Iqbal
 Nasrulla Butt
 Imran Rahi
 Jaggi Malik
 Seema
 Khalid Saleem Mota
 Mehboob Alam
 Irfan Khoosat

References

External links 

 Main Artists In Film Wehshi Daku (Punjabi - 1982)

1982 films
Punjabi-language Pakistani films
Pakistani action films
1980s Punjabi-language films
1982 action films